Zheng Xinmiao (born October 1947) is a Chinese politician and scholar.

Biography
Zheng was born Zheng Xinmiao in Chengcheng County, Shaanxi, in October 1947. He joined the Communist Party of China in January 1970 and entered the workforce in July 1970. From July 1970 to July 1975 he worked in his home-county. He worked in Weinan Municipal Government between July 1975 and October 1977. He served in various posts in the Shaanxi Provincial Government before serving as leader of the Cultural Group of the Policy Research Office of the Central Committee of the Communist Party of China in October 1977. He was vice-governor of Qinghai in September 1995, and held that office until October 1998, when he was appointed deputy director of the National Cultural Heritage Administration. In September 2002 he was promoted to become vice-minister of culture, a position he held until November 2008. He became curator of the Palace Museum in September 2003, and served until January 2012. In September 2013 he became president of the newly established Palace Museum Research Institute.

References

1947 births
Chinese curators
Northwest University (China) alumni
Living people
People's Republic of China politicians from Shaanxi
Chinese Communist Party politicians from Shaanxi